Francisco Jozenilton Veloso (8 May 1971 – 14 January 2016), better known by his pseudonym and stage name Shaolin, was a Brazilian cartoonist, caricaturist, humorist, comedian and media presenter.

Biography
He was born in Coremas, Paraíba. He started his career at the Teatro Municipal Severino Cabral in Campina Grande. He also worked as a presenter on Rádio Campina Grande and drew cartoons for the newspapers A Palavra, Jornal da Paraíba and Revista Nordeste.

Shows

His best-known shows are Domingão do Faustão,  Show do Tom; and most recently Tudo è Possível ("All is possible") with Ana Hickmann, in which he satirized Brazilian celebrities, for example Leonardo, Joelma (singer in the duo Banda Calypso) and Zezé di Camargo.

Accident
On 19 January 2011, Shaolin was seriously injured in a traffic accident when his car collided with a truck in Campina Grande on the highway BR-230. 

Until May he remained in a coma in intensive care, and then left hospital to go home although he had not recovered from his injuries. 

In September 2012 he began communicating again using movements of his eyelid helped by a machine.

Family
In December 1994 he married Laudiceia Veloso, with whom he had two children.

Death
On 14 January 2016, Shaolin died following a myocardial infarction.

References

External links

 Shaolin's Twitter

People from Paraíba
Brazilian cartoonists
Brazilian caricaturists
Brazilian journalists
Brazilian humorists
Disease-related deaths in Paraíba
1971 births
2016 deaths